Annona hystricoides is a species of plant in the Annonaceae family. It is endemic to Ecuador.  Its natural habitat is subtropical or tropical moist lowland forests. It is threatened by habitat loss.

References

hystricoides
Endemic flora of Ecuador
Critically endangered plants
Taxonomy articles created by Polbot